The Saturday Night Experience Volume 1 is the seventh studio album by American singer Jody Watley, released on November 17, 1999, issued under Avitone Records. Exclusively released as an import only in Japan and Australia, later available in 2002 as an EP in North America.

Background
The Saturday Night Experience Volume 1 found Watley experimenting more freely with underground electronic styles like deep house, drum n bass, trip hop and downtempo. Originally intended as an EP (hence the subtitling: "with Jody Watley"), the recording's popularity with fans caused Watley to declare it a full-length album proper. 

Watley's current new material also foreshadowed the fully club-friendly sounds that Watley would embrace on subsequent full-length releases. In 2002, a North America limited edition version of The Saturday Night Experience, dubbed The Saturday Night Experience EP, was sold exclusively through Watley's own official website. Packaged in a paper sleeve, the limited pressing contained remixes of "Timeless" and "Pure Joy".

Track listings

Personnel
Jody Watley – vocals, background vocals
Ethan Farmer – bass
Kristoffer Wallman – keyboards, producer
DJ Kaz – scratching
Rodney Lee – composer
Derrick B. Edmundson – guitar, keyboards, saxophone, soloist, flute
Hitoshi Haruawa – keyboards

Production

Producer – Lati Kronlund, Derrick B. Edmundson, Rodney Lee, Jody Watley
Executive Producer – Bill Coleman
Producer, Remixing – DJ Soma
Producer, Remixing – DJ Turbo
Remixing, Engineer, Producer, Programming – Angel C.
Drum Programming, Engineer, Instrumentation, Mixing, Producer, Programming – Derrick B. Edmundson
Mastering – Steve Hall
Producer, Remixing – Hitoshi Harukawa
Art Direction, Design – Allen Hori
Mixing – Yoshihiro Kawasaki
Drum Programming, Instrumentation, Producer, Programming – Rodney Lee
Instrumentation, Mixing, Producer – Lati Kronlund 
Design – Ed Taylor

References

1999 albums
Jody Watley albums
Downtempo albums
Electronica albums by American artists